Walter Moreira Salles Júnior (born 12 April 1956) is a Brazilian filmmaker.

Early life 
Salles was born on 12 April 1956 in Rio de Janeiro and attended the University of Southern California School of Cinematic Arts. He is the son of Brazilian banker, politician and philanthropist Walter Moreira Salles.

Film career 
Salles's first notable film was Terra Estrangeira (Foreign Land), released in Brazil in 1995. Locally, it was widely acclaimed by film critics and a minor box-office hit, and it was selected by over 40 film festivals worldwide.

In 1998 he released  Central do Brasil (Central Station) to widespread international acclaim and two Academy Awards nominations, for Best Actress in a Leading Role and Best Foreign Language Film. Salles won a Golden Globe Award for Best Foreign Language Film, becoming the first Brazilian to win a Golden Globe.

In 2001, Abril Despedaçado (Behind the Sun), based on a novel by Albanian author Ismail Kadare and starring Rodrigo Santoro, was nominated for the Best Foreign Film Golden Globes. Salles said: ".. there was one book that resonated to the point where I couldn't forget it. And that was 'Broken April' by Ismail Kadare. The book was handed to me by my younger brother, who said, 'If I know you well, this will touch you.' ... What really struck me was the opposition between the atavistic violence described in the book and the possibility for that violence to be overpowered by the discovery of poetry and literature and ultimately by brotherly love."

Both films were produced by veteran Arthur Cohn, and had worldwide distribution.

In 2003, Salles was voted one of the 40 Best Directors in the World by The Guardian. His biggest international success has been Diarios de Motocicleta (The Motorcycle Diaries), a 2004 film about the life of young Ernesto Guevara, who later became known as Che Guevara. It was Salles's first foray as director of a film in a language other than his native Portuguese (Spanish, in this case) and quickly became a box-office hit in Latin America and Europe.

In 2005, Salles released his first Hollywood film, Dark Water, an adaptation of the 2002 Japanese film of the same name. He also helped to produce the Argentine picture Hermanas, which was a major success.

In 2006, Salles wrote and directed a segment in the French film Paris, je t'aime (French for "Paris, I love you") with Daniela Thomas. The film is a collection of 18 shorter segments made by different 21 directors and set in different arrondissements of Paris. Salles' segment called "Loin du 16e" (literally: "Far from the 16th") and took place in the 16th arrondissement of Paris.

In 2007, Salles took part in a similar project called To Each His Own Cinema (French: Chacun son cinéma) in the 60th anniversary of the Cannes Film Festival. He made a 3-minute segment called "A 8 944 km de Cannes" (English: 5,557 Miles From Cannes).

In 2008, Salles wrote and directed the film Linha de Passe also with Daniela Thomas. It is a story about four brothers from a poor family who need to fight to follow their dreams. He was nominated for the Golden Palm and Sandra Corveloni won the best actress award for her role in this film in Cannes Film Festival in 2008.

In 2009, Salles signed a petition in support of film director Roman Polanski, calling for his release after Polanski was arrested in Switzerland in relation to his 1977 charge for drugging and raping a 13-year-old girl.

In 2012, Salles released José Rivera's screenplay adaptation of Jack Kerouac's On the Road, with Francis Ford Coppola producing. The film was nominated for the Palme d'Or at the 2012 Cannes Film Festival.

Filmography

Awards and nominations 

In July 2022 Salles was awarded the honorary degree of Doctor of letters by the University of Reading.

References

External links 

 Video interview with Walter Salles opening Cambridge Film Festival 2008 with "Linha de Passe" ITV Anglia
 Interview with Walter Salles at Cannes 2008 on "Linha de Passe" at IFC.com
 Walter Salles interviewed by Michael Ordoña for the San Francisco Chronicle

1956 births
Living people
People from Rio de Janeiro (city)
Brazilian film directors
Brazilian film producers
Brazilian racing drivers
Brazilian billionaires
Superstars Series drivers
ADAC GT Masters drivers
Pontifical Catholic University of Rio de Janeiro alumni
USC School of Cinematic Arts alumni
Salles family
Directors of Golden Bear winners
Filmmakers who won the Best Foreign Language Film BAFTA Award
Lafer-Klabin family
American directors
GT4 European Series drivers